The 1978 Kansas gubernatorial election was held on November 7, 1978. Democratic nominee John W. Carlin defeated incumbent Republican Robert Frederick Bennett with 49.4% of the vote.

, this marks the last occasion in which the following counties have voted Democratic in a gubernatorial election: Gray, Hamilton, and Ness and until 2022, this was the last gubernatorial election where a Democratic governor was elected during the tenure of a Democratic president.

Primary elections
Primary elections were held on August 1, 1978.

Democratic primary

Candidates
John W. Carlin, Speaker of the Kansas House of Representatives
Bert Chaney
Harry G. Wiles

Results

Republican primary

Candidates
Robert Frederick Bennett, incumbent Governor
Robert R. "Bob" Sanders
Harold Knight

Results

General election

Candidates
Major party candidates
John W. Carlin, Democratic
Robert Frederick Bennett, Republican 

Other candidates
Frank W. Shelton Jr., American
Berry Beets, Prohibition

Results

References

1978
Kansas
Gubernatorial